Blaignan-Prignac is a commune in the Gironde department in Nouvelle-Aquitaine in southwestern France. It was established on 1 January 2019 by merger of the former communes of Blaignan (the seat) and Prignac-en-Médoc.

See also
Communes of the Gironde department

References

Communes of Gironde